Alexandrovsky Uyezd (Александровский уезд) was one of the subdivisions of the Vladimir Governorate of the Russian Empire. It was situated in the western part of the governorate. Its administrative centre was Alexandrov.

Demographics
At the time of the Russian Empire Census of 1897, Alexandrovsky Uyezd had a population of 100,371. Of these, 99.6% spoke Russian, 0.1% Polish, 0.1% Ukrainian, 0.1% Yiddish and 0.1% German as their native language.

References

 
Uezds of Vladimir Governorate
Vladimir Governorate
History of Vladimir Oblast